David Spencer may refer to:

 David A. Spencer, American engineering professor
 David D. Spencer (1799–1855), New York editor and politician
 David E. Spencer, professor of economics at Brigham Young University
 David W. Spencer (1837–1920), Canadian department store founder
 David Spencer (playwright) (born 1955), British playwright
 Ricky Valance (born David Spencer, 1936–2020), Welsh pop singer
 David Spencer (born 1963), kidnapper of Brazilian businessman Abílio dos Santos Diniz
 David Spencer (basketball coach), 2005 coach of the UC Riverside Highlanders
 David Spencer (cyclist) (born 1964), British cyclist
 David Spencer (diplomat), 1991 to 1993 High Commissioners of Australia to Canada

See also
 David Sencer (1924-2011), American public health official
David Spencer Hardy (born 1931), on the List of South African plant botanical authors
David Spencer Smith, 1980 to 1995 Hope Professor of Zoology at Oxford University